The American Society of Maxillofacial Surgeons (ASMS) is a professional organization focused on the science and practice of surgery of the facial region and craniofacial skeleton. The organization is involved in education, research, and advocacy on behalf of patients and maxillofacial surgeons.

History  

The American Society of Maxillofacial Surgeons (ASMS) was founded in 1947.  Early members were largely dual-trained in dentistry and medicine. Over the ensuing years, a relationship with the American Medical Association and American Society of Plastic and Reconstructive Surgeons (now the American Society of Plastic Surgeons) was fostered.  After development of formal maxillofacial training programs and later the birth of the field of craniofacial surgery, the scope of training required for ASMS membership broadened to include surgeons with an MD degree and formal maxillofacial training.  The society commemorated its 75th anniversary in 2022 by honoring the long history and current role of military surgeons in advancing treatment of maxillofacial conditions and by exploring  the interplay between the past and future of maxillofacial surgery in a special edition of the journal FACE.

Education and research 

Education of trainees and peers has been an organizational objective since the inception of the ASMS.  The Kazanjian lectureship was initiated in 1966.  This now biennial lectureship currently alternates with the Converse lectureship at the ASMS portion of the annual meeting of the American Society of Plastic Surgeons.

The maxillofacial basics workshop was founded in 1979.  Fundamentals of maxillofacial surgery and basic techniques for management of maxillofacial trauma and orthognathic conditions are taught to residents and fellows around North America semiannually.

In 1998, the ASMS initiated a one-day intensive lecture series preceding the annual meeting of the American Society of Plastic Surgeons.  Each year, the ASMS pre-conference symposium provided a multi-disciplinary education on topics in the field of craniomaxillofacial surgery for students, surgeons-in-training, and practicing plastic and maxillofacial surgeons. In the late 2010's, topics featured in the ASMS pre-conference symposium became more broadly incorporated into the regular program of the American Society of Plastic Surgeons annual meeting.

In 2003, two educational fellowships were established to foster the advanced learning in the field of craniomaxillofacial surgery. The organization also offers grants for research on maxillofacial conditions.

Scholarly work 

In 2020, the ASMS launched the journal, FACE, in collaboration with the American Society of Craniofacial Surgeons.  The publication is dedicated to advancing the art and science of craniomaxillofacial surgery by disseminating evidence-based peer reviewed research.

Maxillofacial conditions 

American Society of Maxillofacial Surgeons initiatives focus on problems with facial form or function, including  congenital craniofacial differences, facial trauma, reconstruction after head and neck cancer, and problems with bite.  Congenital craniofacial differences are conditions affecting the head and face that present at or shortly after birth such as craniosynostosis, cleft lip and palate, hemifacial microsomia (aka craniofacial microsomia, oculoauriculovertebral spectrum, or Goldenhar syndrome), and Treacher Collins syndrome (aka mandibulofacial dysostosis).  Traumatic facial injuries include orbital (eye socket) fracture, mandible (jaw) fracture, nasal fracture (broken nose), dog bite, and gunshot wound.  Treatment of head and neck cancer and skin cancer of the face often results in missing tissue requiring jaw reconstruction, skin reconstruction, and nose reconstruction.  Problems with occlusion (bite) may be treated with orthognathic surgery.  American Society of Maxillofacial Surgeons members have contributed to early achievement in face transplant, which is emerging as treatment for the most severe maxillofacial deformities.

References

External links
 
 FACE Journal

Plastic surgery